Enrico Brignola (born 8 July 1999) is an Italian footballer who plays for  club Catanzaro on loan from Benevento as a winger.

Club career

Benevento
Brignola made his professional debut for Benevento on 17 September 2016, in a Serie B match against Latina. Benevento were promoted at the end of the season as winners of the play-offs.

On 3 December 2017, aged 18, he made his Serie A debut for Benevento in a 2–2 draw against Milan at Stadio Ciro Vigorito.

Sassuolo
On 2 August 2018, Brignola signed for Serie A club Sassuolo.

Livorno
On 2 September 2019, Brignola joined Serie B side Livorno on loan until 30 June 2020.

SPAL
On 25 September 2020 he joined SPAL on loan. On 30 January 2021, Brignola terminated his loan with SPAL and he returned to Sassuolo.

Frosinone
On 1 February 2021 he was loaned to Serie B club Frosinone.

Return to Benevento
On 31 August 2021, he returned to Benevento on loan with an obligation to buy.

Cosenza
On 5 July 2022, Brignola was loaned by Benevento to Cosenza, with an option to buy.

Catanzaro
On 25 January 2023, Brignoloa moved on loan to Serie C club Catanzaro. Catanzaro will hold an obligation to buy his rights in case of their promotion to Serie B.

International career
On 25 May 2018, Brignola made his debut with the Italy U21 team in a 3–2 friendly defeat to Portugal.

Career statistics

Club 
Updated as of 11 June 2019.

Honours

International 

UEFA European Under-19 Championship runner-up: 2018

References

External links
 

Living people
1999 births
People from Caserta
Footballers from Campania
Association football wingers
Italian footballers
Italy youth international footballers
Italy under-21 international footballers
Benevento Calcio players
U.S. Sassuolo Calcio players
U.S. Livorno 1915 players
S.P.A.L. players
Frosinone Calcio players
Cosenza Calcio players
U.S. Catanzaro 1929 players
Serie A players
Serie B players
Sportspeople from the Province of Caserta